Stéphane better known by his stage name Damn Kids, is a Canadian electronic music producer and performer based in Toronto, Ontario, Canada. Damn Kids produces a variety of genres that are mainly categorized under electronica, bass music, and trap. Along with original productions, Damn Kids has also remixed artists such as Pleasurekraft, Mark Knight, and Green Velvet.

Music
Since early 2012, Damn Kids has released several productions through labels such as Provoke, Trouble & Bass, Great Stuff Recordings, Toolroom Records, Eklektisch, and Oh! My God It's Techno Music. Damn Kids music has also been featured on predominant BBC Radio 1 shows such as Skream & Benga, Diplo & Friends, & In New DJs We Trust.

On May 21, 2012, Damn Kids released his 'Yema EP' on Provoke, which created a significant spotlight for the artist, and reached its chart position of #32 on Beatport's Electronica Chart. This release also caught the attention of Trouble & Bass label owners AC Slater & Drop The Lime who commissioned him to write an EP for the label, later to be known as 'Govudoh'. 'Naej' from 'Govudoh' went on to Beatport charting fame, spending 5 weeks in the Beatport Electronica Chart at a peek position of #52.

December 17, 2012 saw the release of Damn Kids 2 track single entitled 'Kavoda', which sat in the Beatport Electronica Chart for nine weeks with a peek position of #29.

Discography

Releases
Choke - Provoke 03/12/2012

Yema EP - Provoke 05/21/2012

Udjo Buto EP - Provoke 07/30/2012

Govudoh EP - Trouble & Bass	10/16/2012

Pleasurekraft ft. Green Velvet - Skeleton Key (Damn Kids Remix) - Great Stuff Recordings 12/03/2012

Kavoda EP - Provoke 12/17/2012

A-Bot - Deadman Walking (Damn Kids Remix) - Provoke 01/14/2013

Centoro EP - Provoke 02/11/2013

2beeps - Loose Cannon (Damn Kids Remix) - Oh! My God It's Techno Music 03/29/2013

Worthless EP - Trouble & Bass 04/23/2013

Pleasurekraft - Tarantula (Damn Kids Remix) Eklektisch 05/28/2013

External links

References 

https://archive.today/20130630134958/http://wanticketsblog.com/2013/02/11/wantickets-exclusive-getting-to-know-damn-kids/

https://archive.today/20130629123351/http://www.ibizadreaming.com/music/kavoda-original-mix-damn-kids-preview/
https://archive.today/20130629115518/http://www.ibizadreaming.com/music/5457/

http://www.thebasscollective.com/2012/10/22/damn-kids-govudoh-ep/

1992 births
Living people
Canadian electronic musicians